Syltefjorden is a fjord in Båtsfjord Municipality in Troms og Finnmark county, Norway. The Varangerhalvøya National Park lies just south of the fjord.

Historically, there were three fishing villages located around the fjord: Nordfjord, Hamna, and Ytre Syltefjord. All three villages were abandoned during the 20th century. Along the northern shore of the fjord lies the large Syltefjordstauran mountain. The mountain is home to a very large bird colony that is popular among tourists.

References

External links
Photographs from around the Syltefjorden

Båtsfjord
Fjords of Troms og Finnmark